The 2001 PBA Governor's Cup Finals was the best-of-7 championship series of the 2001 PBA Governor's Cup and the conclusion of the conference's playoffs. The San Miguel Beermen and Sta. Lucia Realtors played for the 80th championship contested by the league.

Sta. Lucia Realtors captured their first-ever PBA title after 8 years of participation in the league, winning over defending champions San Miguel Beermen in six games.

Gerald Francisco won his first Finals MVP in Governors Cup Finals.

Series scoring summary

Games summary

Game 1

Damien Owens watched his teammates handled the offensive chores in the third quarter where Marlou Aquino, Dennis Espino and Paolo Mendoza shown, when San Miguel's hardworking import Lamont Strothers' shooting suddenly fell silent, the Realtors dealt the finishing blows as Owens drained a shot-clock beating jumper and Gerard Francisco canned a triple in the last three minutes.

Game 2

Danny Seigle connected mostly from the shaded area in the final quarter and Lamont Strothers knocked in two key straight baskets as the Beermen pulled even in the series.

Game 3

Damien Owens knocked in a game-high 32 points, 14 of which came in the second half. The Realtors had a big run late in the second period, Gerard Francisco hit a buzzer-beating triple to give Sta.Lucia a 48–35 margin at halftime.

Game 4

Lamont Strothers poured 18 of his game-high 38 points in the second quarter and went 4-of-4 from the three-point range as the Beermen built an insurmountable 58–35 lead at the half. The winning margin was the third most lopsided win in PBA finals history.

Game 5

Struggling and groping for form in the first half, the Realtors recovered at the start of the third quarter. Damien Owens bounced back from a poor performance in Game four, firing 13 points in the endgame to finish with 37 points.

Game 6

With the score tied at 72-all, only 3.3 seconds remaining, Chris Tan, who went 0-of-8 from the three-point area in the entire best-of-seven series, made the shot of his life, unleashed a triple that swished the net as the Realtors ended a nine-year title-drought and win their first championship. Gerald Francisco won on his first Finals MVP and Sta. Lucia captures win on his 1st championship title.

Rosters

Broadcast notes

References

External links
PBA official website

2001 PBA season
2001
San Miguel Beermen games
Sta. Lucia Realtors games
PBA Governors' Cup Finals